Matheus Antunes Ribeiro (born 23 October 1993) is a Brazilian footballer who plays as a right back for CRB.

Club career

Early career
Born in Erechim, Rio Grande do Sul, Matheus Ribeiro was an Internacional youth graduate. After a short spell at Juventude, he moved to União Frederiquense on 7 March 2014.

Matheus Ribeiro subsequently joined hometown's Ypiranga in 2014.

Atlético Paranaense
After impressing with Ypiranga in 2015 Campeonato Gaúcho, Matheus Ribeiro signed a one-year deal with Atlético Paranaense on 27 April of the following year. He made his Série A debut on 4 July 2015, coming on as a late substitute for Eduardo in a 0–2 away loss against Cruzeiro.

Matheus Ribeiro appeared rarely for Furacão during the campaign, and left the club on 11 January 2016.

Atlético Goianiense
On 20 January 2016, Matheus Ribeiro signed a short-term deal with Série B side Atlético Goianiense. He renewed his contract on 19 May 2016, signing until the end of the year.

Matheus Ribeiro scored his first professional goal on 21 June in a 1–1 draw at Avaí. On 14 October, he scored a double in a 2–1 home win against Paysandu.

Santos
On 11 November 2016, as his contract was due to expire, Matheus Ribeiro agreed to a pre-contract with Santos, ahead of the 2017 season. He made his debut for the club the following 12 March, starting in a 4–1 Campeonato Paulista away routing of São Bernardo FC.

After the injuries of Zeca and Caju, Matheus made his Copa Libertadores debut on 4 May 2017, starting as a left back in a 3–2 home win against Independiente Santa Fe. He would spend the rest of the season as a backup to Victor Ferraz and Daniel Guedes in the right flank.

On 12 January 2018, Matheus was loaned to Liga MX side Club Puebla for one year, with a buyout clause. He made his debut abroad twelve days later, starting in a 0–0 Copa Mexico home draw against Alebrijes de Oaxaca.

On 12 July 2018, after being rarely used, Matheus was announced by Figueirense on loan until the end of the year, with a buyout clause. His loan was extended for a further campaign on 10 December, but he was recalled the following 20 January after a request from new manager Jorge Sampaoli.

Despite being recalled, Matheus Ribeiro only featured rarely and was subsequently deemed surplus to requirements throughout the season.

Chapecoense
On 31 December 2019, Matheus Ribeiro moved to Chapecoense on loan for the season. On 6 November, he terminated his contract with Santos and signed for Chape permanently.

Career statistics

Honours
Atlético Goianiense
Campeonato Brasileiro Série B: 2016

Chapecoense
Campeonato Catarinense: 2020
Campeonato Brasileiro Série B: 2020

References

External links
 

1993 births
Living people
People from Erechim
Brazilian footballers
Association football defenders
Campeonato Brasileiro Série A players
Campeonato Brasileiro Série B players
Esporte Clube Juventude players
Ypiranga Futebol Clube players
Club Athletico Paranaense players
Atlético Clube Goianiense players
Santos FC players
Figueirense FC players
Associação Chapecoense de Futebol players
Avaí FC players
CR Vasco da Gama players
Liga MX players
Club Puebla players
Brazilian expatriate footballers
Brazilian expatriate sportspeople in Mexico
Expatriate footballers in Mexico
Sportspeople from Rio Grande do Sul